Arnold Hugh Stocks (June 5, 1927 – November 10, 2018) was a Canadian football player who played for the Toronto Argonauts and Calgary Stampeders. He won the Grey Cup with the Argonauts in 1950. He died in November 2018 at the age of 91.

References

1927 births
2018 deaths
Calgary Stampeders players
Players of Canadian football from Ontario
Canadian football people from Toronto
Toronto Argonauts players